The 1972–73 Chicago Black Hawks season was the Hawks' 47th season in the NHL, and the club was coming off their third consecutive first-place finish in 1971–72, as they finished on top of the West Division with a 46–17–15 record, tying a club record with 107 points. The Hawks defeated the St. Louis Blues and New York Rangers in the postseason before falling to the Montreal Canadiens in the Stanley Cup final.

During the off-season, the Black Hawks lost Bobby Hull to the Winnipeg Jets in the newly created World Hockey Association, who signed him to the first $1 million contract in hockey history. The NHL also expanded once again, as the New York Islanders joined the East Division, while the Atlanta Flames were placed in the West.

Chicago, dealing with the loss of Hull, got off to a quick start of the season, winning their first four games, before sliding into a slump that saw their record fall to 7–7–2. The club broke out of its slump, won 14 of the next 18 games, and took hold of the top spot in the West Division.  The Hawks then cruised to their fourth-straight first-place finish, as they had a record of 42–27–9, earning 93 points, which was their lowest point total since missing the playoffs in the 1968–69 season.

Offensively, the Black Hawks were led by Jim Pappin, who had a career season, scoring 41 goals and 92 points.  Pit Martin earned 61 assists and 90 points, while Dennis Hull scored 39 goals and 90 points.  Stan Mikita earned 83 points despite missing 21 games due to injuries.  Bill White lead the defense, registering 47 points, while Pat Stapleton scored 10 goals and 31 points.  Rookie Phil Russell had a team-high 156 penalty minutes, and had a +31 rating, which tied him with Mikita for the team lead.

In goal, Tony Esposito led the club with 32 victories and a 2.51 GAA, along with four shutouts while appearing in 56 games.  Backup goaltender Gary Smith won 10 games while having a 3.54 GAA.

The Hawks opened the playoffs against the St. Louis Blues, who had a record of 32–34–12, earning 76 points, while placing fourth in the West Division.  The series opened with two games at Chicago Stadium, and the Black Hawks easily defeated the Blues in the series opener, winning 7–1, before shutting out St. Louis, 1–0, in the second game to take an early series lead.  The series shifted to the St. Louis Arena for the next two games; however, Chicago took a 3–0 series lead, winning 5–2 in the third game, but the Blues avoided the sweep, winning 5–3 in the fourth game.  Chicago returned home for the fifth game, and easily took care of St. Louis, thumping the Blues 6–1 to win the series.

Chicago's next opponent was the New York Rangers, who had finished the season with a 47–23–8 record, earning 102 points, and a third-place finish in the East Division.  The Rangers defeated the defending Stanley Cup champions, the Boston Bruins in their first playoff series.  Since the Black Hawks won their division, they were given home ice advantage in the series.  The series opened up with two games at Chicago Stadium, but it was the Rangers who struck first, winning the series opener by a 4–1 score.  The Black Hawks rebounded in the second game, holding off New York for a 5–4 victory to even the series.  The series moved to Madison Square Garden for the next two games, and it would be the Hawks who took control of the series, defeating the Rangers 2–1 and 3–1 to take a 3–1 series lead back to Chicago for the fifth game.  The Black Hawks stayed hot, and easily beat the Rangers 4–1 to win the series and advance to the Stanley Cup finals for the second time in three years.

The Hawks opponent in the 1973 Stanley Cup finals was the Montreal Canadiens, who were the best team in the league during the regular season, as they had a 52–10–16 record, earning 120 points.  The Canadiens had defeated the Buffalo Sabres and Philadelphia Flyers to earn a spot in the finals.  The series opened at the Montreal Forum, and the powerful Canadiens easily won the first game by an 8–3 score, followed by a 4–1 win in the second game to take a 2–0 series lead.  The finals shifted to Chicago Stadium for the next two games, and the Hawks cut into the Canadiens series lead with a 7–4 victory in the third game.  Montreal rebounded in the fourth game though, shutting out Chicago 4–0 to take a 3–1 series lead.  The fifth game returned to Montreal; however, the Black Hawks stayed alive with a wild 8–7 victory, cutting the Canadiens lead to 3–2 in the series.  In the sixth game back in Chicago, Montreal rebounded, defeating the Hawks, 6–4, to win the Stanley Cup.

Season standings

Game log

Regular season

Chicago Black Hawks 4, St. Louis Blues 1

Chicago Black Hawks 4, New York Rangers 1

Montreal Canadiens 4, Chicago Black Hawks 2

Season stats

Scoring leaders

Goaltending

Playoff stats

Scoring leaders

Goaltending

Draft picks
Chicago's draft picks at the 1972 NHL Amateur Draft held at the Queen Elizabeth Hotel in Montreal, Quebec.

References

Sources
Hockey-Reference
Rauzulu's Street
Goalies Archive
HockeyDB
National Hockey League Guide & Record Book 2007

Chicago Blackhawks seasons
Chicago
Chicago